Donte Paige-Moss (born April 11, 1991) is an American football defensive end who is currently a free agent. He played college football for the North Carolina Tar Heels.

College career
He played at North Carolina. Entering the 2011 season, he was regarded as one of the top prospects for the 2012 NFL Draft by analysts.

In December 2011, Moss left school early and declared for the draft. However, concerns about his character and work habits led to his non-selection in the draft. Other concerns surfaced after Paige-Moss posted a series of tweets during the 2011 Independence Bowl that media members judged "inappropriate."

Professional career
Paige-Moss entered the 2012 NFL Draft but was not selected.

Sacramento Mountain Lions
He was listed on the training camp roster. He was released before appearing in any games.

Toronto Argonauts
On October 5, 2012, Paige-Moss was signed to the Toronto Argonauts practice roster. Paige-Moss finished the 2012 CFL season in which he only recorded 2 Tackles. On December 19, 2012, Paige-Moss re-signed with the Toronto Argonauts. On June 7, 2013, he was released.

Portland Thunder
Paige-Moss was assigned to the Portland Thunder on October 28, 2013.

San Jose SaberCats
On March 19, 2015, Paige-Moss was traded to the San Jose SaberCats for Jordan Mudge.

Orlando Predators
On December 23, 2015, Paige-Moss was assigned to the Orlando Predators.

Personal life
While attending UNC-Chapel Hill, Moss was charged with simple assault after punching a teammate in the face twice.

Less than a month after going undrafted, he was arrested and charged with speeding, reckless driving to endanger and driving while impaired in Chapel Hill, North Carolina.

References

External links
UNC Tar Heels bio
Sacramento Mountain Lions bio
Toronto Argonauts bio

1991 births
Living people
People from Jacksonville, North Carolina
Players of American football from North Carolina
American football defensive ends
North Carolina Tar Heels football players
Sacramento Mountain Lions players
Toronto Argonauts players
Portland Thunder players
San Jose SaberCats players
Orlando Predators players